Khan may refer to:

Khan (inn), from Persian, a caravanserai or resting-place for a travelling caravan
Khan (surname), including a list of people with the name
Khan (title), a royal title for a ruler in Mongol and Turkic languages and used by  various ethnicities 
Khagan, an imperial title used by monarchs of various regimes

Art and entertainment 
Khan (band), an English progressive rock band in the 1970s
Khan! (TV series), a 1975 American police detective television series
Khan (serial), a 2017 Pakistani television drama serial
Khan Maykr, the main villain of Doom Eternal, the leader of the heavenly Urdak realm
Khan Noonien Singh, a prominent Star Trek villain in an original series episode and the principal antagonist in Star Trek II: The Wrath of Khan, then later Star Trek Into Darkness
Citizen Khan, a British sitcom about a British-Indian man, Mr Khan

Radio
KHAN (FM), a defunct radio station (99.5 FM) formerly licensed to serve Chugwater, Wyoming, United States
KBGB, a radio station (105.7 FM) licensed to serve Kensett, Arkansas, United States, which held the call sign KHAN from 2011 to 2013

People
Khan Jamal (1946-2022), American musician
Khan Bonfils, Korean-Danish actor

Places
 List of places named Khan
 Khan (Cambodia), an administrative unit of Cambodia
 Khan Market, a market in Delhi
 Khan Palace, a town located in Bakhchisaray, Crimea
 Khan River, an ephemeral river in Namibia
 Khan River (India), also spelled Kahn

Other uses 
Khan Academy, a not-for-profit educational organization

See also 
Beg Khan, a surname
Kan (disambiguation)
Caan (disambiguation)
Han (disambiguation)
Xan (disambiguation)

Feudalism